All Time Super Best is a compilation album by Tomoyasu Hotei.  It features work from his entire career, spanning three decades. His solo work such as Russian Roulette is accompanied with tracks such as Be My Baby and Bad Feeling, which were hits with his bands Complex and Boøwy respectively. It also includes yet another version of his now internationally prolific Battle Without Honor or Humanity.

2005 compilation albums
Tomoyasu Hotei albums